Gubernatorial Election in Kirov Oblast were held on 10 September 2017.

Background
In the previous elections in 2014 won a Nikita Belykh, who led the region since 2009. The term was due to expire in September 2019.

24 Jun 2016 Nikita Belykh was arrested in Moscow at reception of a bribe. On 25 June Investigative Committee of Russia has charged White 
with receiving a bribe in especially large size. On the same day, the Basmanny court of Moscow, he was arrested for two months. After his arrest, the duties of the Governor of the Kirov region was performed by his Deputy Alexey Kuznetsov.

July 28, 2016, Russian President Vladimir Putin has dismissed Nikita Belykh from the post of Governor of the Kirov region with the formulation "in connection with loss of trust". Acting Governor until the election appointed Igor Vasilyev.

Candidates
Candidates on the ballot:

Opinion polls

Result

See also
2017 Russian gubernatorial elections

References

2017 elections in Russia
2017 Russian gubernatorial elections
Politics of Kirov Oblast